

Music
 "Used To" (LeToya Luckett song), 2017
 "Used To" (Sandro Cavazza song), 2018
 "Used To", by Daughtry from Daughtry, 2006
 "Used To", by Wire from Chairs Missing, 1978